The 1959 Penn State Nittany Lions baseball team represented Pennsylvania State University in the 1959 NCAA University Division baseball season. The head coach was Joe Bedenk, serving his 29th year.

The Nittany Lions lost in the College World Series, defeated by the Oklahoma State.

Roster

Schedule 

! style="" | Regular Season
|- valign="top" 

|- align="center" bgcolor="#ccffcc"
| 1 || April 8 ||  || New Beaver Field • University Park, Pennsylvania || 10–6 || 1–0
|- align="center" bgcolor="#ccffcc"
| 2 || April 14 ||  || New Beaver Field • University Park, Pennsylvania || 8–7 || 2–0
|- align="center" bgcolor="#ffcccc"
| 3 || April 17 ||  || New Beaver Field • University Park, Pennsylvania || 3–6 || 2–1
|- align="center" bgcolor="#ccffcc"
| 4 || April 18 || Ohio State || New Beaver Field • University Park, Pennsylvania || 6–1 || 3–1
|- align="center" bgcolor="#ccffcc"
| 5 || April 18 || Ohio State || New Beaver Field • University Park, Pennsylvania || 8–2 || 4–1
|- align="center" bgcolor="#ccffcc"
| 6 || April 22 || at Bucknell || Unknown • Lewisburg, Pennsylvania || 2–1 || 5–1
|- align="center" bgcolor="#ccffcc"
| 7 || April 25 || at  || Unknown • Washington, D. C. || 9–0 || 6–1
|- align="center" bgcolor="#ccffcc"
| 8 || April 25 || at Georgetown || Unknown • Washington, D. C. || 17–3 || 7–1
|-

|- align="center" bgcolor="#ccffcc"
| 9 || May 2 ||  || New Beaver Field • University Park, Pennsylvania || 10–3 || 8–1
|- align="center" bgcolor="#ccffcc"
| 10 || May 5 || at  || Unknown • Annapolis, Maryland || 6–3 || 9–1
|- align="center" bgcolor="#ccffcc"
| 11 || May 8 || at  || Unknown • Hamilton, New York || 7–5 || 10–1
|- align="center" bgcolor="#ffcccc"
| 12 || May 9 || at  || Lew Carr Field • Syracuse, New York || 6–10 || 10–2
|- align="center" bgcolor="#ccffcc"
| 13 || May 9 || at Syracuse || Lew Carr Field • Syracuse, New York || 9–1 || 11–2
|- align="center" bgcolor="#ccffcc"
| 14 || May 16 || at  || Unknown • Morgantown, West Virginia || 4–2 || 12–2
|- align="center" bgcolor="#ffcccc"
| 15 || May 20 ||  || New Beaver Field • University Park, Pennsylvania || 5–6 || 12–3
|- align="center" bgcolor="#ccffcc"
| 16 || May 20 || Pittsburgh || New Beaver Field • University Park, Pennsylvania || 10–0 || 13–3
|- align="center" bgcolor="#ffcccc"
| 17 || May 22 || at  || Erny Field • Philadelphia, Pennsylvania || 9–13 || 13–4
|-

|-
|-
! style="" | Postseason
|- valign="top"

|- align="center" bgcolor="#ccffcc"
| 18 || June 4 || Temple || New Beaver Field • University Park, Pennsylvania || 16–4 || 14–4
|- align="center" bgcolor="#ccffcc"
| 19 || June 5 ||  || New Beaver Field • University Park, Pennsylvania || 7–3 || 15–4
|-

|- align="center" bgcolor="#ccffcc"
| 20 || June 13 || vs Connecticut || Omaha Municipal Stadium • Omaha, Nebraska || 5–3 || 16–4
|- align="center" bgcolor="#ffcccc"
| 21 || June 14 || vs Oklahoma State || Omaha Municipal Stadium • Omaha, Nebraska || 6–8 || 16–5
|- align="center" bgcolor="#ccffcc"
| 22 || June 15 || vs Clemson || Omaha Municipal Stadium • Omaha, Nebraska || 7–0 || 17–5
|- align="center" bgcolor="#ffcccc"
| 23 || June 16 || vs Oklahoma State || Omaha Municipal Stadium • Omaha, Nebraska || 3–4 || 17–6
|-

|-
|

References 

Penn State Nittany Lions baseball seasons
Penn State Nittany Lions baseball
College World Series seasons